The Commander-in-Chief National Historic Park is a historic site of national historic significance associated with the Turkish War of Independence comprising the battleground of the last battle (literally "Field Battle of the Commander-in-Chief") in the Greco-Turkish War (1919–22).

References

External links

National parks of Turkey
Turkish War of Independence
Tourist attractions in Afyonkarahisar Province
Tourist attractions in Kütahya Province
Tourist attractions in Uşak Province
1981 establishments in Turkey
Protected areas established in 1981
Historic sites in Turkey
Greco-Turkish War (1919–1922)